The  was an anti-tank gun developed by the Imperial Japanese Army, and used in combat during World War II. The Type 1 number was designated for the year the gun was accepted, 2601 in the Japanese imperial year calendar, or 1941 in the Gregorian calendar.

History and development
The Type 1 47 mm anti-tank gun was accepted into service in 1942. The design originated as an improvement to the prototype “Experimental Type 97 (1937) 47 mm anti-tank gun” (試製九七式四十七粍速射砲), which was tested between 1938 and 1939. The prototype weighed 567 kilograms and had a barrel length of 2,515 mm, a traverse range of ±50 degrees and an elevation range of between minus 10 and plus 20 degrees, and a muzzle velocity of 730 m/s. The prototype was not accepted into service because it was considered to not have sufficient performance.

After the Nomonhan Incident, the Imperial Japanese Army started the development of a new anti-tank gun, considering that the Type 94 37 mm anti-tank gun would likely be ineffective against the new Soviet tanks. The design was the first completely indigenous anti-tank gun design completed in Japan, and production was assigned to the army's Osaka Arsenal. In terms of performance, the design was still inferior to advanced contemporary designs in western nations, but was considered suitable by the Imperial Japanese Army General Staff due to the anticipated lack of armor by the National Revolutionary Army of the Republic of China, and by the belief that Japan would face only light tanks fielded by the Allied nations in case of a more general war. The Type 1 47 mm AT Gun was introduced in 1942, and approximately 2,300 were produced.

Design
The Type 1 47 mm AT gun was a relatively modern design compared to other Japanese Second World war designs, being relatively light and easy to handle. As with many Japanese designs, it had a very low profile and was intended to be operated from a kneeling or prone position. The gun had a gun shield to protect the gunner. The carriage appears to have adopted a number of design features from the Soviet ZIK 45 mm anti-tank gun, a number of examples of which were captured by the Japanese during the Battle of Khalkhin Gol (Nomonhan) in 1939. It used a semi-automatic breech block with a horizontal sliding wedge. When the gun was fired the spent shell casing was automatically ejected, and upon loading a fresh shell, the breech block closed automatically. A hydro-spring recoil mechanism was housed under the barrel. The weapon had a split trail which opened to an angle of 60 degrees for firing to improve stability. Transport was by towing behind a truck or horse, via two steel disc wheels fitted with sponge rubber filled tires.

Ammunition
The Type 1 was the only gun to ever use the 47×285mmR cartridge, which in spite of its niche application, enjoyed a decent amount of success in military capabilities for a rare proprietary round, at the very least performing comparably to those of contemporary European guns of a similar caliber. Two types of shells were known to have been used with this ammunition, as follows:

Type 1 APHE shell
The round also had a tracer.

Type 1 HE shell
It contained  of explosive, consisting of a small block of picric acid and a larger block of TNT.

Combat record

The Type 1 47 mm AT gun was introduced to combat service in 1941, with the intent of it replacing the Type 94  anti-tank gun. It was very effective for its role, with American personnel calling it "an excellent weapon, with mechanized carriage and a high muzzle-velocity" that "proved most effective in combat," though it was not always available in sufficient numbers. The weaker APHE shell, while incapable of penetrating the M4 Medium's  of effective front armor, could still penetrate the tank's side of vertical armor), the most likely part of the tank to get hit, at a distance of more than a kilometre. It was issued to armored units as well as independent anti-tank units, and was fielded in a wide variety of areas, but most notably the Philippines and Okinawa, and continued to be used with diminishing effectiveness until the end of World War II.

After World War II the Type 1 47 mm AT gun was used in the Indonesian National Revolution by the Indonesian Army. In the Battle of Surabaya Dutch forces and British forces suffered moderate casualties among their convoy which consisted of M3 Stuarts and M4 Shermans.

Type 1 47 mm tank gun 

A variant known as the Type 1 47 mm tank gun was used as the main armament of the Type 97 Shinhoto Chi-Ha, Type 1 Chi-He, Type 3 Ka-Chi, and Type 5 Ke-Ho tanks.
The tank gun had the following specifications:
Calibre: 47 mm
Barrel length:  (L48)
Elevation: -15 to +20 degrees
AZ angle of fire : 20 degrees
Muzzle velocity: 

References

Bibliography
 Bishop, Chris (eds) The Encyclopedia of Weapons of World War II. Barnes & Nobel. 1998. 
 Chant, Chris. Artillery of World War II, Zenith Press, 2001, 

McLean, Donald B. Japanese Artillery; Weapons and Tactics. Wickenburg, Ariz.: Normount Technical Publications 1973. .
 Nakanishi, Ritta Japanese Infantry Arms in World War II, Dainipponkaiga Company 1991, 
 US Department of War, TM 30–480, Handbook on Japanese Military Forces, Louisiana State University Press, 1994. 
 War Department TM-E-30-480 Handbook on Japanese Military Forces September 1944

External links

 Taki's Imperial Japanese Army Page – Akira Takizawa
 US Technical Manual E 30–480
 Japanese 47-mm AT Gun, U.S. War Department, Tactical and Technical Trends, No. 43, January 27, 1944.

Artillery of Japan
1
1
47 mm artillery
World War II anti-tank guns
Tank guns
Weapons and ammunition introduced in 1942